Harry Horner Barnhart (May 24, 1874 - September 3, 1948) was the conductor of the New York Community Chorus.

He was born  in West Newton, Pennsylvania to Peter DeWitt Barnhart and Nancy A. Horner. He married Anna Vogan Reynolds. He died in Manhattan, in 1948.

References

1874 births
1948 deaths
American choral conductors
American male conductors (music)
People from West Newton, Pennsylvania
20th-century American conductors (music)
Classical musicians from Pennsylvania
20th-century American male musicians